Lundavra is a rural locality in the Goondiwindi Region, Queensland, Australia. In the  Lundavra had a population of 100 people.

History 
Lundavra State School opened on 3 February 1964.

In the  Lundavra had a population of 100 people.

Road infrastructure
The Moonie Highway passes to the north, the Leichhardt Highway to the east, the Barwon Highway to the south, and the Meandarra Talwood Road (State Route 74) to the west.

Education 
Lundavra State School is a government primary (Prep-6) school for boys and girls at 238 Lienassie Road. In 2016, the school had an enrolment of 10 students with 2 teachers (1 full-time equivalent) and 4 non-teaching staff (2 full-time equivalent).In 2018, the school had an enrolment of 14 students with 2 teachers and 4 non-teaching staff (2 full-time equivalent).

There is no secondary school in Lundavra. The nearest secondary school is Goondiwindi State High School in Goondiwindi to the south-east. However, it is sufficiently distant that distance education or boarding school would be other options.

References 

Goondiwindi Region
Localities in Queensland